"You Made My Day Tonight" is a single by Canadian country music group Canadian Zephyr. Released in 1978, it was a single from their album The Best of Canadian Zephyr. The song reached number one on the RPM Country Tracks chart in Canada in March 1979.

Chart performance

References

1978 singles
Canadian Zephyr songs
1978 songs
RCA Records singles
Song articles with missing songwriters